Khaobaisri Subdistrict Municipality Football Club (Thai สโมสรฟุตบอลเทศบาลตำบลเขาบายศรี), is a Thai football club based in Rayong, Thailand. The club is currently playing in the 2017 Thaileague 5 tournament Eastern Region.

Record

References

 http://www.khaobaisri.go.th/index.php/ball/21-sport
 http://matichon.co.th/readnews.php?newsid=1382157037&grpid=00&catid=07

External links
 Facebook Page

Association football clubs established in 2014
Football clubs in Thailand
Sport in Chonburi province
2014 establishments in Thailand